Daniel Evans (born 23 May 1990) is a British professional tennis player from England. He has been ranked as high as world No. 22 in singles by the Association of Tennis Professionals (ATP), which he achieved on 27 September 2021, and is the current British No. 2 in singles. He reached a career-high ranking of world No. 52 in doubles on 26 April 2021. In 2015, he formed part of the winning British Davis Cup team.

In Grand Slam events, Evans reached the fourth round of the 2017 Australian Open and of the 2021 US Open. Evans has made seven third-round major appearances at the 2013 US Open, at Wimbledon 2016, at the 2016 US Open, at Wimbledon 2019, at the 2019 US Open, at Wimbledon 2021, and at the 2022 Australian Open. Evans's three ATP Tour finals to date have been the 2017 Apia International Sydney (losing to Gilles Müller), Delray Beach Open (losing to Radu Albot), and the 2021 Murray River Open, where he beat Felix Auger-Aliassime to win his first title.

Evans made his Davis Cup debut for Great Britain against Poland in September 2009. Evans twice won deciding fifth rubbers, against Slovakia and Russia respectively, helping Great Britain progress to the Davis Cup World Group. Evans also played in the semifinal against Australia, losing both of his rubbers, and was a substitute for the Final against Belgium, with Great Britain winning the Davis Cup in 2015, the nation's first success in the tournament for 79 years. The Davis Cup team was awarded the 2015 BBC Sports Personality Team of the Year Award.

Early and personal life
Evans, often referred to as "Evo", grew up in the Hall Green area of Birmingham, his father is an electrician, his mother a nurse, and he has two older sisters.
 
At first, Evans played squash with his father, aged seven, at the local squash and tennis club, the West Warwickshire Sports Club in Solihull, only falling into tennis by chance a couple of years later. Once Evans had got to grips with his preferred racket it became quickly apparent that he had some ability and he began training in earnest, moving to Edgbaston Priory aged 10.

By the time he was 13, Evans had moved to Loughborough to live with a host family while training at the LTA's academy at Loughborough University. Of his time at Loughborough, he said: "I was never the best at 14 and 15, in fact, I was probably the worst. I was smaller than the others and a bit of a late developer, but I always thought I was pretty good and in the end, I was the best."

Evans supports Aston Villa F.C. and has a single figure golf handicap.

Junior career

2004
Evans was a member of the British team that won the World Junior Tennis competition in the Czech Republic aged 14.
Evans was guided by LTA Academy coaches Mark Taylor and Leighton Alfred, who both continued working with him sporadically over the years.

2006
In March, Evans won the junior title at Marcq-en-Baroeul, putting him at the top of the European under-16 rankings.

The Lawn Tennis Association withdrew him from the Wimbledon junior tournament for being, in his own words, "stupid on court".

2007
In April, Evans was invited to the Davis Cup tie against the Netherlands, as a hitting partner for Tim Henman and Jamie Murray.

In June, Evans had his first win on the ATP tour in the Nottingham qualifier, losing in the second round.

In July, Evans first victories on the Futures tour, after seven attempts, were at the Great Britain F11 in Felixstowe, where he won two rounds before being beaten in the quarterfinals.

Evans reached the quarterfinals of the US Open boys' singles. Evans won a junior tournament in Paraguay, was a runner-up in the Czech Republic and reached a semi-final in Chile. He also had a successful year in a doubles partnership with David Rice, winning tournaments in Brazil, Uruguay and France.
Evans was coached by Mark Hilton at the Nottingham Tennis Centre.

2008
Evans started the year at the Nottinghill junior tournament, by reaching the singles quarterfinals, and the doubles final partnering Dan Cox.

At the Australian Open, Evans reached the quarterfinals of the boys' singles, where he lost to Yuki Bhambri. Again with Dan Cox, they reached the doubles quarterfinals.

He went on to win the fourth junior title of his career in Nottingham.

Junior Slam results – Singles:

Australian Open: QF (2008)
French Open: 1R (2007), 2R (2008)
Wimbledon: 1R (2007), 3R (2008) 
US Open: QF (2007)

Junior Slam results – Doubles:

Australian Open: QF (2008)
French Open: 1R (2007), QF (2008)
Wimbledon: 1R (2007), 2R (2008)
US Open: 2R (2007)

Professional career

2008
At the start of the year, Evans began working at the National Tennis Centre with Paul Annacone, the LTA men's head coach, who used to work with Pete Sampras and Tim Henman.

In May, Evans reached the quarterfinals of the Bournemouth Futures, achieving a ranking of 1339. A week later, he had another quarterfinal appearance at the Edinburgh Futures, and won the doubles with Joshua Milton at the same event.

In June, he was given a wild card into the Artois Championships, playing Belgian Xavier Malisse in the first round at Queen's Club. He played in the boys' tournament at Wimbledon, but was suspended until November 2008 by the LTA after he was photographed with Daniel Smethurst at a nightclub in the early hours of the morning. The next day, he partnered Smethurst in the boys' doubles event. In addition to losing his funding, he was also denied wild cards to tournaments and access to practice centres and LTA coaching staff. Instead, Evans trained at the West Warwickshire Club in Solihull.

In August he won his first senior title, a Futures event in Wrexham. Later that month he won in London, with a third senior title coming that October in Glasgow,

He ended the year by winning the LTA Male Junior Player of the Year award
and ranked world No. 477.

2009
In February, Evans took part in the play-offs for the British Davis Cup team, but lost out to Josh Goodall and Chris Eaton.

Evans won the singles title at The Caversham International in March, an ATP Challenger Tour event, rising to an ATP ranking of world No. 305.

Evans was granted a wildcard into Wimbledon, and was defeated by the 12th seed Nikolay Davydenko. In August, he lost in the first round of qualifying for the US Open to Brazilian Júlio Silva.

In September, Evans, the British No 5, made his debut as part of the Great Britain Davis Cup squad for the Europe/Africa Zone Group I relegation playoff against Poland, along with Andy Murray, Joshua Goodall, James Ward, Ross Hutchins and Ken Skupski. He played in the tie, losing to Jerzy Janowicz in the second rubber, and then losing to Michał Przysiężny in the deciding final rubber. Great Britain were relegated to Europe/Africa Zone Group II for the first time since 1996.

In November, he reached the second round of the Caversham ATP Jersey Open, where he lost to Finland's Jarkko Nieminen.

2010
Evans began the year by winning his first qualifying tie in Doha, but lost to Steve Darcis in the second qualifying round. A week later, he succeeded in qualifying for an ATP Tour event for the first time, but lost in the first round of the Heineken Open in Auckland to Michael Lammer. This loss allowed him to take part in qualifying for the Australian Open where he won his first qualifying match against Sean Berman. He lost in the second round to Santiago Ventura.

In March, Evans was called to the Davis Cup team in the Europe/Africa Zone Group II tie vs Lithuania, in Vilnius, with James Ward, Ken Skupski and Colin Fleming. The Lithuanian side entered the tie as underdogs; fielding a team of teenagers. Ward won his debut Davis Cup match. Evans lost the second singles match, Fleming and Skupski won their doubles, but Ward and Evans were both beaten on the final day. Evans' defeat was his fourth in two Davis Cup appearances and came against a player ranked 269 places below him at 521 in the world and who had never played a match on the ATP World Tour. This was described as a humiliating Davis Cup defeat for Great Britain, and led to the resignation of Davis Cup Captain John Lloyd. Britain was now threatened with relegation to the lowest tier of the competition.

After failing to qualify for The Championships, Evans moved away from Birmingham to train at the Nottingham Tennis Centre, where he would be coached by Mark Taylor and Leighton Alfred.

In December, the Lawn Tennis Association announced cuts to its financial support for some of Britain's underperforming players from 43 to 30, after raising the standards it requires them to meet. This included Evans, who had been hailed as the country's most promising youngster but had in the past been criticised for a poor attitude.

2011
Evans reached the final of three Futures and the semifinal at the Bath Challenger, which led to the All England Club awarding him a wild card for the Championships.

At Wimbledon, Evans lost a close first-round match against the 20th seed Florian Mayer.

Evans' only title this year was the Chiswick Futures F11 doubles with Liam Broady in July.

In December, the Lawn Tennis Association reduced its list of funded players to 23, but Evans was added to the programme, with Julien Hoferlin becoming his coach.

2012
Evans began the year by competing in a number of UK based ITF Futures tournaments, securing his first singles title of the year in Sheffield in mid-January, where he defeated David Rice in the final. The following month, Evans entered qualifying for the PBZ Zagreb Indoors in Croatia, winning his three qualification matches before ultimately losing in three sets to Guillermo García-López in the opening round of the main draw.

In February, Evans was instrumental in Great Britain's 3–2 victory over Slovakia, in the Davis Cup Europe/Africa Zone Group I tie. His ATP record stood at zero wins from 10 matches, while Lukáš Lacko had reached the final ATP event in Zagreb only six days ago. Evans won both of his singles matches, defeating much higher ranked players. Evans dismantled Lukáš Lacko, ranked 211 places above him, and Martin Kližan, ranked 156 places higher, in the deciding rubber. These were Evans' first Davis Cup wins.

Evans was ranked No 291 when he pulled off two of the most unexpected wins against the Slovak Republic. By April, he was down to world No. 344, having failed to defend his points from last year's Bath Challenger.

Evans also received a qualifying wild card for the Sony Ericsson Open in Miami, but lost in straight sets to Björn Phau.

In April, Evans was selected for Davis Cup Europe/Africa Zone Group I tie against Belgium. After Josh Goodall lost the first rubber, Evans, the world No. 344 pushed Olivier Rochus (#59) to the limit, but Rochus prevailed to take the match. Colin Fleming and Ross Hutchins won their doubles match, but Evans and Goodall lost their second singles matches. Great Britain were beaten 4–1, condemning Leon Smith to his first defeat as Davis Cup Captain.

Soon after the Belgium tie, Evans arrived at the National Tennis Centre, to discover that his LTA coach, Julien Hoferlin had been assigned to Oliver Golding, the former US Open junior champion, instead.
Evans was now unable to afford foreign travel, so he spent the next 12 months playing in Britain and Ireland, at ITF Futures level, as well as taking in one Challenger tournament towards the latter stages of the year. He won four ITF Pro Circuit singles titles during the year, all in England. This tally included two titles in as many weeks in September, dropping just one set in ten matches.

Evans was stripped of his funding by the Lawn Tennis Association at the end of the year, having seemingly failed to convince the association of his commitment to the sport.

2013

For several months, there was a possibility Evans might quit, as his parents found it difficult to support his career with the necessary £20–25,000-a-year.

After not initially being picked for Great Britain's squad for the Davis Cup tie versus Russia, Evans was given a last-minute place ahead of Britain's no. 3, Jamie Baker. Evans played valiantly in his first rubber against world No. 67 Dmitry Tursunov before losing in five tight sets. With Great Britain trailing 2–0 to Russia, the GB doubles pairing of Colin Fleming and Jonny Marray reduced the deficit a day later, before James Ward levelled the tie at 2–2 after beating Tursunov in five sets. The result meant that Evans had the chance to complete an unlikely comeback when he faced world No. 80 Evgeny Donskoy in the final rubber. Evans defeated Donskoy comprehensively in straight sets, thus securing what was described as a "famous victory". The last time Great Britain had come from 2–0 down to win a Davis Cup tie was 83 years ago against Germany, Consequently, Great Britain won a place in the 16-team World Group play-offs in September.

After discussion with Davis Cup captain Smith, the LTA once again agreed to support Evans with a coach and conditioner. He could also practise at the National Tennis Centre in Roehampton, and was now able to afford to play abroad.
In May at his first tournament outside the UK for 12 months, Evans won a clay-court ITF tournament in Båstad, Sweden, where he beat Grzegorz Panfil in the final.

Evans was then given a main-draw wildcard for the 2013 Aegon Trophy in Nottingham in June, reaching the quarterfinal stage of the tournament. In the first round, Evans was dealt a tough draw but overcame fifth seed, and world No. 92, Ryan Harrison in three sets. He then defeated Australian-born Brit Brydan Klein in straight sets in the second round, before losing to the eventual champion, Australian Matthew Ebden in the quarter-finals. Shortly before Evans' victory over Klein, he was informed that he had been handed a main-draw wildcard at the Queen's Club, London, for the 2013 Aegon Championships. He won his first-round match comfortably, beating world No. 75 Guido Pella in straight sets. His fine form continued in the following round when Evans disposed of world No. 37, Finland's Jarkko Nieminen, in three sets. He had been a break down at 2–4 in the final set, taking four consecutive games to record the victory. It was the first time Evans had beaten a player ranked in the top 50.
In the third round, Evans went down to Juan Martín del Potro in straight sets.

Evans received a wild card into the Wimbledon qualifiers, where he lost in the first round to Spain's Daniel Muñoz-De La Nava.

Evans reached only his second Challenger final in Vancouver, where he picked up some notable scalps along the way. He defeated top seed Evgeny Donskoy, eighth seed Olivier Rochus, and fifth seed Bobby Reynolds to set up a final clash with second seed and home favourite Vasek Pospisil, where he lost in three sets. This performance saw Evans rise to the top 200 for the first time, reaching number 194, and he also gained direct entry to the Comerica Bank Challenger. Evans completed back-to-back Challenger finals, defeating top seed Guido Pella for the second time this year along the way. In the final, he lost to American Bradley Klahn despite holding match point in the second set. This run would see Evans rise to a career-high of no. 169 and become Britain's no. 2.

After coming through three rounds of qualifying Evans qualified for his first slam event in over two years at the US Open and his first outside Wimbledon. On 26 August at the US Open, he achieved his most impressive victory to date, beating 11th seed Kei Nishikori in the first round in straight sets, to become one of only six British players to beat a player inside the ATP top 15 in a slam since 1990. The others were Andy Murray, Tim Henman, Greg Rusedski, Jeremy Bates and Nick Brown. Evans made the third round of a Grand Slam for the first time, beating Bernard Tomic of Australia in the second round in four sets. He ultimately lost to 19th seed Tommy Robredo in the third round; however, this earned him prize money of US$93,000, almost half of his entire career earnings up to that point.

The 23-year-old reached a career-high ranking of 149, becoming British No 2, and consequently, Evans was picked as Britain's second singles player in the Davis Cup World Group play-off against Croatia in Umag on clay. Evans lost his Friday's singles match against Croatia's No 1 Ivan Dodig, ranked 35, but Andy Murray, playing in his first Davis Cup tie for two years, won both his singles matches and the doubles with Colin Fleming.
Evans won the dead rubber to help beat Croatia 4–1, and return Great Britain to the World Group for the first time since 2008.

2014
Evans began the year at the 2014 Qatar Open where he came through Qualifying before losing to Ernests Gulbis in the first round. In Melbourne, Evans entered the qualifying competition of the 2014 Australian Open as the 26th seed, however, lost in the second round of qualifying to Hungarian Márton Fucsovics.

In February he entered the qualifying stages of the PBZ Zagreb Indoors as the third seed, losing in the final round of qualification to Bjorn Phau, however he received entry to the main draw as a lucky loser after the withdrawal of 7th seed Radek Štěpánek. Evans beat Jan Hájek and Michael Berrer in the first two rounds to make his first-ever quarterfinal at ATP World Tour level. He then stunned third seed Philipp Kohlschreiber in three sets, overcoming a ranking deficit of 120 places. In the semifinal, he lost to Tommy Haas in three tight sets. Despite this loss, he rose to a new career-high ranking of 123.

After losing in the first round of Wimbledon, his coach, Julien Hoferlin departed for his home country of Belgium, and told journalists "He [Evans] has the potential to make himself a top-60 player, but he makes no sacrifices for his sport. He doesn't understand that tennis has to be his priority. For him, it's just a brief interlude in his life."

Evans had a bad knee injury at Wimbledon and missed the last three months of the year.

2015: Davis Cup champion
At the start of this year, Evans played three events, but in March he was fined £350 for failing to turn up for the F4 Futures event on the Wirral, sparking fears about his commitment. He then disappeared for 3 months, struggling with a knee injury that sent his ranking to an all-time low of 772 in May.

In June, Evans lost in qualifying for three straight Challengers in Manchester, Surbiton and Ilkley, all on grass.
At Wimbledon, Evans lost his final qualifying match against Japan's Yūichi Sugita.
However, since May, Evans returned to some kind of form, reeling off 29 wins from 33 matches, with four Futures titles, Egypt, Frinton, Felixstowe & Nottingham, Roehampton finalist and a run to the semis of a Challenger in Vancouver, where he beat Czech Radek Stepanek along the way.

His ranking recovered to exactly No. 300, and the fact that Evans beat Australian Bernard Tomic in the 2013 US Open, led to his surprise recall to the Great Britain squad for the Davis Cup Semi-Final against Australia. Evans was not even among four contenders that GB team captain Leon Smith named for two singles berths just over a week previously, but was now picked ahead of the injured Kyle Edmund, who is 200 places above him in the rankings at 100, and the woefully out-of-form James Ward. Though Evans lost both his singles matches, Great Britain won 3–2 and reached the Davis Cup Final for the first time since 1978.

On 15 November, Dan Evans, ranked 271, won the Knoxville Challenger on a hard court. On the same day, Kyle Edmund won the Copa Fila Challenge title in Argentina on clay beating Argentina's Carlos Berlocq, ranked No 112 in the world and an expert on the red stuff. James Ward lost in the second round of the same event, though Ward, ranked 156, had also recently won a hard court challenger tournament.

With Belgium opting to stage the Davis Cup Final on an indoor clay court, Leon Smith chose to go with the British number two Edmund, now ranked 100.
Evans and Dominic Inglot accompanied the nominated British team of Andy Murray, Kyle Edmund, Jamie Murray, James Ward, as hitting partners. Great Britain went on to win the Davis Cup for the first time since 1936. Evans and Dominic Inglot joined the team on the winner's podium, and they all received the same Davis Cup medals.

Evans joined the rest of the Davis Cup team at the BBC Sports Personality of the Year Show, where they won the 2015 Team of the Year Award.

2016: Top 60 debut
In January Evans entered the qualifying for the Australian Open. He advanced to the main draw of the tournament for the first time in his career where he lost comfortably to 18th seed Feliciano López, winning only five games in three sets.

At the RBC Tennis Championships of Dallas in February, Evans was beaten by Kyle Edmund in the first all-British Challenger final since 2005, when Alex Bogdanovic beat Mark Hilton.

Six weeks later, there was a second all-British final, at the Challenger Banque Nationale de Drummondville in Canada, where world No. 157 & British No 4, Evans defeated world No. 531 & British No. 17, Edward Corrie, in two sets to claim his third ATP Challenger title. Evans rose to No. 125, two places short of his highest ever ranking.

Evans also reached the final of the Drummondville Doubles
playing with Lloyd Glasspool. Evans played eight doubles events this year, four with Lloyd Glasspool.

Evans, Kyle Edmund, Dominic Inglot, Andy Murray and Jamie Murray were named for the Davis Cup World Group 1st round match against Japan. On the Wednesday before the tie, Edmund picked up a back injury during practice, so Dan Evans was chosen as the second singles player. Though Evans had beaten Kei Nishikori at the 2013 US Open, he lost his Davis Cup rubber against Kei Nishikori, but Great Britain won 3–1 and progressed to the quarter-finals.

Evans missed the entire clay-court season for the second year running.
In April Evans played in the Santaizi ATP Challenger in Taiwan where he advanced to the final without dropping a set. In the final, he beat Russian Konstantin Kravchuk in three sets. This marked a major career milestone for Evans who by winning the title, broke the top 100 of the ATP rankings for the first time, and Great Britain now had four players inside the top 100 for the first time since 1979. A week later, Evans reached the final of the Busan Open Challenger in South Korea, but afterwards Evans had a poor grass-court season in the lead up to Wimbledon.

Evans' ranking allowed him to enter Wimbledon without the need for a wild card. In the first round, he faced Jan-Lennard Struff, and won in four sets, despite suffering an injury in the fourth set. He defeated 30th seed Alexandr Dolgopolov in the second round in straight sets, enabling passage to a third-round match against 3rd seed and seven-time champion Roger Federer on Centre Court. However he lost in straight sets, this was only the second time Evans had reached the third round of a grand slam and his first third-round match at a grand slam since 2013.

John Lloyd chose Evans to play World TeamTennis for the San Diego Aviators in August, but he pulled out with no explanation.
Evans was named for the Davis Cup quarter-final tie against Serbia on clay, but withdrew, citing a shoulder injury after switching to clay, and "a couple of issues at home". Evans was offered a place in the Rio Olympics due to several withdrawals, but instead he continued on the Tour to improve his ranking.

A day after the Davis Cup Serbia tie, Evans was in Washington for the Citi Open where he beat world No. 40 Grigor Dimitrov to reach the last 16. Although he eventually lost in the 3rd round against American big server Jack Sock. Following an impressive run in Washington, Evans won a 3rd challenger title of the year on 14 August in an all British final against Cameron Norrie.

At the US Open, he defeated 27th seed Alexander Zverev in 4 sets in the second round. The teenage Zverev was regarded as a future world No. 1, and Evans thought this was the best result of his career, being his third victory against a top-30 opponent. Evans equalled his previous best tournament performance by reaching the third round, and pushing 3rd seed and eventual champion Stan Wawrinka to 5 sets, eventually losing after setting up a match point in the 4th set tiebreak. Including Andy Murray and Kyle Edmund, Great Britain had three men in the last 32 for the first time since 1968. He rose to a career-high ranking of world No. 53.

In the US Open Doubles, Evans teamed up with Nick Kyrgios, winning two rounds, but they withdrew from the next match with both players citing injury from their singles matches.

Initially, Evans, Andy Murray, Kyle Edmund, Jamie Murray and Dominic Inglot were called upon for the Davis Cup semi-final against Argentina. Eventually, Inglot was dropped to give the team more singles options, though Evans was a possible doubles partner for Jamie Murray because he had played seven doubles events so far this year. With the tie poised at 2–2, Evans played the deciding rubber against Leonardo Mayer, winning the first set but finally losing in four sets.

2017: Australian Open fourth round, Top 50, failed drug test, ban 
January saw Evans beat 8th ranked Dominic Thiem at Sydney Apia International before winning the semi final to meet Gilles Müller in Evans' first ATP Tour final. He was the first English born player to reach a singles final there in more than 11 years (Tim Henman being the last in 2006) but lost the match in straight sets.

The following week, Evans beat seventh-seed Marin Čilić in the second round of the Australian Open. Evans progressed to the fourth round with a straight sets win over Bernard Tomic, setting up a round-of-16 tie with Jo-Wilfried Tsonga (seeded 12th). While he lost the match in 4 sets, this was the furthest he had progressed in any Grand Slam event to date.

Playing in the 2017 Davis Cup World Group first round against the Canada Davis Cup team, Evans beat Denis Shapovalov before losing to Vasek Pospisil, the Great Britain Davis Cup team progressing to the quarter finals.

Evans was banned from playing professional tennis due to testing positive for cocaine in April 2017. Evans claims that he took a relatively small amount of cocaine out of competition, but that some permitted medication he was taking was then 'contaminated' by the cocaine because he accidentally put the leftover cocaine in the pocket of his washbag, thus testing positive in-competition. Evans was eligible to return to the professional circuit on 24 April 2018, having completed a one-year ban.

2018: Return to tennis
Evans returned from his drugs ban on 28 April 2018, having only started training again two months earlier, defeating compatriot Edward Corrie in the first round of qualifying in an ATP Challenger Tour event in Glasgow. He subsequently defeated Sam Barry to qualify for the main draw of the tournament, but lost in the first round to Lucas Miedler.

Evans was not awarded a wildcard for the 2018 Wimbledon Championships. However, following victories in two pre-qualifying matches, Evans secured a wildcard entry to the main qualifying event.

2019–2020: British No. 1, top 30 and Inaugural ATP Cup debut

Evans reached the final of the 2019 Delray Beach Open, but lost to Radu Albot in a third-set tiebreaker. On 14 October 2019 he became Britain's number 1.

Evans started the 2020 season by competing in the inaugural ATP Cup, and reached a new career-high of No. 33 on 13 January 2020. In February Evans stunned the seventh seed Andrey Rublev of Russia in the quarterfinals at the Dubai Tennis Championships in Dubai, U.A.E. to advance to the semis. Then in the last four he lost to the Greek player Stefanos Tsitsipas in straight sets. As a result of this, Evans' ranking rose to No. 28 in the world.

Evans also reached the semifinals in Antwerp and Vienna, where he lost to Ugo Humbert and Lorenzo Sonego, respectively.

He finished the year ranked No. 33 in the world.

2021: First singles title & Masters semifinal, two doubles finals, Major fourth round, top 25
In February, Evans earned his first ATP Tour title at the Murray River Open in Melbourne. As a result, he reached a new career-high ranking of world No. 26 on 8 February 2021 in singles. At the 2021 Australian Open, he lost in the first round to compatriot Cameron Norrie.

At the beginning of April, Evans reached his first Masters 1000 final with compatriot Neal Skupski at the 2021 Miami Open and entered the top 100 in the doubles rankings for the first time.

At the Monte-Carlo Masters, Evans recorded his first ever victory over a world number 1 after he beat Novak Djokovic in straight sets. The victory also meant Evans reached his first Masters 1000 quarterfinal. He defeated David Goffin in the quarterfinals as well to reach his first Masters 1000 singles semifinal, where he lost to eventual champion Stefanos Tsitsipas. In the same tournament, partnering again with Neal Skupski, he reached his second Masters 1000 doubles final within two weeks, losing again to 2nd seeded Mate Pavic and Nikola Mektic. As a result, he reached a career-high of world No. 56 in doubles on 19 April 2021.

Evans next played at the 2021 Mutua Madrid Open, where he defeated Jeremy Chardy and John Millman to reach the last 16. He lost to 5th seed Alexander Zverev in straight sets.

After losing in the first round of the 2021 Italian Open and the 2021 French Open, Evans reached the quarterfinals of the 2021 Nottingham Open, beating Thanasi Kokkinakis and Matthew Ebden before losing to sixth seed Denis Kudla. He made his top 25 debut on 14 June 2021. The following week, he also reached the quarterfinals as the sixth seed of the 2021 Queen's Club Championships, losing to eventual champion Matteo Berrettini in straight sets.

Seeded twenty-second, Evans reached the third round of the 2021 Wimbledon Championships. After scoring straight-set wins against Feliciano López and Dušan Lajović, In the third round, Evans lost to Sebastian Korda in four sets.

Evans was set to play at the 2020 Tokyo Olympics, representing Great Britain, playing in the men's singles event and partnering with Neal Skupski in the men's doubles. However, shortly before the start of the Olympics, Evans tested positive for COVID-19, forcing him to self-isolate and withdraw from the event. He was replaced by Jamie Murray in the doubles, who lost in the second round.

At the US Open, he reached his second Major fourth round by defeating Alexei Popyrin in a fifth-set tiebreak after returning from two sets down. He then lost to world No. 2 Daniil Medvedev. As a result of his US Open run, Evans rose to a career high ranking of No. 23 on 13 September 2021.

After the US Open, Evans played a number of events on the post-US Open hard-court swing, both in singles and in doubles with Fabio Fognini at the San Diego Open, and Neal Skupski at the Indian Wells Masters, Vienna Open, and Paris Masters. He lost in the first or second round of all of the post-US Open tournaments.

2022: Second Australian Open third round and Masters semifinal 
Evans started his season playing for Great Britain at the 2022 ATP Cup. Evans won all of his matches in the group stage, with singles wins against Germany's Jan-Lennard Struff, Canada's Denis Shapovalov, and the United States' John Isner. He also won his two doubles matches where he paired with Jamie Murray to win against Germans Kevin Krawietz and Alexander Zverev, as well as Americans John Isner and Taylor Fritz. Evans went on to reach the semifinals of the 2022 Sydney International, where he was seeded third. He beat Pedro Martínez and Maxime Cressy before losing to Aslan Karatsev.

Seeded 24th, Evans entered into the Australian Open and beat David Goffin in straight sets in the first round. Evans advanced to the third round following a withdrawal from Arthur Rinderknech due to injury, where he was defeated by 9th seed Félix Auger-Aliassime.

Seeded 16th at the 2022 Citi Open, he reached the quarterfinals with a win over Taylor Fritz by retirement. At the 2022 National Bank Open he repeated the same feat defeating tenth seeded Fritz to reach again the quarterfinals, only for a second time at a Masters 1000, having defeated fifth seed and world No. 8 Andrey Rublev in the previous round in straight sets. He went one step further to reach his second semifinal at the Masters 1000 level defeating American Tommy Paul. In the semifinals, he lost to eventual winner Pablo Carreno Busta in three sets.

Seeded 20th at the US Open, Evans lost in the third round to Marin Čilić in a four set match lasting four hours.

2023: Third Australian Open third round
Evans again made it to the third round of the Australian Open, where he was defeated by Andrey Rublev.

Playing style

Evans is an all-court player who plays a tactical game with an emphasis on counter-punching and neutralising or re-directing pace. Evan's groundstrokes are solid but not overwhelming weapons, especially his single-handed backhand, which he tends to slice. His game usually involves counter-punching and moving opponents around from the baseline, before finding an opportunity to inject pace and attack. He is known to be a tactical, adaptable player, able to use his variety to probe for weaknesses and disrupt opponents' rhythm. He often uses the backhand slice to neutralise the pace in rallies, and also the drop shot to bring opponents to the net, exploiting opponents too comfortable at the baseline. Additionally, Evans is a skilled volleyer and is capable of serve-and-volleying. His lack of consistent power from the baseline has been cited as a weakness, though he makes up for it with speed and defensive skills.

Image
Evans has been referred to as 'the bad boy of British tennis' and 'the most egregious wasted talent in British tennis'.
Evans has lost his LTA funding twice, because of his off-court behaviour and lack of commitment. Firstly as an 18-year-old, he went clubbing in the early hours, the night before a doubles match with Dan Smethurst at the 2008 Junior Wimbledon, which they subsequently lost. Evans was considered to have significant potential but his LTA coaches found his commitment frustratingly inconsistent over the years, so in 2012, Evans was stripped of his funding a second time. Evans's reputation as someone who likes a night out and a drink has persisted, but he insists it is controlled.

In 2014, sports agent Stuart Duguid, of the management company Lagardere Unlimited, said of his charge Evans, 'British tennis fans are desperate for another top player to get behind in addition to Murray. Dan offers something a little bit different – he's more edgy and unpredictable. He's a bit of an enigma.'

Performance timelines

Singles
Current through the 2023 BNP Paribas Open.

Doubles

Significant finals

Masters 1000 finals

Doubles: 3 (3 runner-ups)

ATP career finals

Singles: 3 (1 title, 2 runner-ups)

Doubles: 3 (3 runner-ups)

ATP Challenger and ITF Futures finals

Singles: 40 (22–18)

Doubles: 20 (7–13)

Record against other players

Record against top-10 players
Evans' match record against players who have been ranked world No. 10 or higher, with active players in boldface.
Only ATP Tour main draw and Davis Cup matches are considered.
Statistics correct .

Record against players ranked No. 11–20
Active players are in boldface. 

 Bernard Tomic 3–1
 Alex de Minaur 2–0
 Philipp Kohlschreiber 2–0
 Frances Tiafoe 2–4
 Borna Ćorić 1–0
 Alexandr Dolgopolov 1–0
 Marcel Granollers 1–0
 Jarkko Nieminen 1–0
 Guido Pella 1–0
 Albert Ramos Viñolas 1–0
 Andreas Seppi 1–0
 Nikoloz Basilashvili 1–1
 Feliciano López 1–1
 Kyle Edmund 1–2
 Pablo Cuevas 0–1
 Jerzy Janowicz 0–1
 Xavier Malisse 0–1
 Paul-Henri Mathieu 0–1
 Florian Mayer 0–1
 Reilly Opelka 0–1
 Dmitry Tursunov 0–1
 Aslan Karatsev 0–2
 Lorenzo Musetti 0–2

Wins over top 10 players
Evans has a  record against players who were, at the time the match was played, ranked in the top 10.

National participation

Davis Cup (12–20)

United Cup (1–3)

ATP Cup (8–1)

References

External links
 
 
 
 
 LTA profile

English male tennis players
Sportspeople from Birmingham, West Midlands
1990 births
Living people
Hopman Cup competitors
English sportspeople in doping cases
Doping cases in tennis
British male tennis players
Tennis people from the West Midlands (county)